Tiberinus may refer to:
 Tiberinus (god), deity of the River Tiber
 Tiberinus Silvius, the ninth king of Alba Longa